Ashley Delgado Do Rosario (born 18 August 2004) is a Luxembourger footballer who plays as a midfielder for Dames Ligue 1 club Young Boys Diekirch and the Luxembourg women's national team.

International career
Delgado Do Rosario made her senior debut for Luxembourg on 21 June 2019 during a 2–1 friendly win against Andorra.

International goals

References

2004 births
Living people
Women's association football midfielders
Luxembourgian women's footballers
Luxembourg women's international footballers
Luxembourgian people of Cape Verdean descent